Metasphenisca transilis is a species of tephritid or fruit flies in the genus Metasphenisca of the family Tephritidae.

Distribution
Ethiopia, Sudan, Kenya, Malawi, Mozambique.

References

Tephritinae
Insects described in 1947
Diptera of Africa